The United States Federal Aviation Administration (FAA) has a system for categorizing public-use airports (along with heliports and other aviation bases) that is primarily based on the level of commercial passenger traffic through each facility.  It is used to determine whether an airport is eligible for funding through the federal government's Airport Improvement Program (AIP).  Fewer than 20% of airports in the U.S. qualify for the program, though most that don't qualify are private-use-only airports.

At the bottom end are general aviation airports.  To qualify for the AIP, they must have at least 10 aircraft based there but handle fewer than 2,500 scheduled passengers each year.  This means that most aircraft are small and are operated by individuals or other private entities, and little or no commercial airline traffic occurs.  Nearly three-quarters of AIP-funded airports are of this type.

Most of the remaining airfields that qualify for funding are commercial service airports and are more dependent on regularly scheduled commercial airline traffic.  This is subcategorized into primary airports, which handle more than 10,000 passengers each year, and nonprimary airports, which handle between 2,500 and 10,000 passengers annually. These categories account for over 15% of AIP-funded airports in the U.S.

A third major category contains reliever airports, which are essentially large general-aviation airports located in metropolitan areas that serve to offload small aircraft traffic from hub airports in the region.  These account for the remaining 10% of AIP-funded airports.

Subcategories
Primary airports are further subcategorized based on the number of passenger boardings as a fraction of the national total.   The categories are:
Nonhub primary – airports handling over 10,000 but less than 0.05% of the country's annual passenger boardings
Small hub primary – airports with 0.05 to 0.25% of the country's annual passenger boardings
Medium hub primary – airports handling 0.25 to 1% of the countrys annual passenger boardings
Large hub primary – airports handling over 1% of the country's annual passenger boardings

See also
List of the busiest airports in the United States

References

Airport categories